Valdenir da Silva Vitalino, or simply Da Silva (born February 21, 1977), is a former Brazilian midfielder.

Da Silva previously played for several Brazilian clubs including Vasco da Gama and Flamengo in the Campeonato Brasileiro. He also spent his career at the Korean club FC Seoul and the Japanese soccer club Tokushima Vortis.

Club statistics

References

External links

 

1977 births
Living people
Brazilian footballers
Brazilian expatriate footballers
CR Vasco da Gama players
CR Flamengo footballers
Bangu Atlético Clube players
Associação Atlética Ponte Preta players
Madureira Esporte Clube players
Associação Desportiva Cabofriense players
Macaé Esporte Futebol Clube players
FC Seoul players
Expatriate footballers in South Korea
Tokushima Vortis players
Brazilian expatriate sportspeople in Japan
J2 League players
Expatriate footballers in Japan
Brazilian expatriate sportspeople in South Korea
Association football midfielders
People from Barra Mansa